The Men's 25 metre rapid fire pistol singles event of the 2010 Commonwealth Games took place on 8 October 2010, at the CRPF Campus. There was a qualification held to determine the final participants.

Results

External links
Report

Shooting at the 2010 Commonwealth Games